"Among the Walking Dead" is a single by Scarface from Motown Records' Walking Dead soundtrack. Produced by N.O. Joe, "Among the Walking Dead" featured an uncredited guest appearance by Scarface's group, Facemob. The song was a minor hit on the R&B and rap charts, peaking at 91 and 14 respectively.

Single track listing
"Among the Walking Dead" (Radio Edit)- 3:37
"Among the Walking Dead" (LP Version)- 3:38
"Among the Walking Dead" (Instrumental)- 3:38
"Among the Walking Dead" (Acapella)- 3:24

Charts

1995 singles
Scarface (rapper) songs
1995 songs
Motown singles